Podomachla antinorii is a moth of the  family Erebidae. It is found in Cameroon, Ethiopia, Sierra Leone and Tanzania.

References

Nyctemerina
Moths described in 1880